Robert Ralph Minkoff (born August 11, 1962) is an American filmmaker. He is best known for co-directing The Lion King (along with Roger Allers), and live-action films including Stuart Little (1999), Stuart Little 2 (2002), The Haunted Mansion (2003), and The Forbidden Kingdom (2008). In recent decades, he returned to feature animation with Mr. Peabody & Sherman (2014) and Paws of Fury: The Legend of Hank (2022). His wife, Crystal Kung Minkoff, is a cast member on The Real Housewives of Beverly Hills.

Early life
Minkoff was born to a Jewish family in Palo Alto, California to Jack Robert Minkoff (1922–1998) and Tola Fay Minkoff (née Stebel). He studied at Palo Alto High School and graduated from the California Institute of the Arts in the early 1980s in the Character Animation department. During his studies, Minkoff had met Chuck Jones and credited him as an inspiration. He recalled, "I met Chuck during my first year at CalArts and he became a mentor to me ...I had always been a big fan of his and having the opportunity to learn from him has really meant a great deal to me professionally as well as personally."

Career
During the summer of 1982, Minkoff received an internship at Walt Disney Productions, and was apprenticed by Eric Larson, a senior animator who was one of the "Nine Old Men". The following year, he was employed as an in-between artist for The Black Cauldron (1985). He was then a supervising animator for The Great Mouse Detective (1986) for the character Olivia, before working as a character designer for The Brave Little Toaster (1987). He also wrote the song "Good Company" for Oliver & Company (1988), and subsequently served as a character animator for The Little Mermaid (1989). On the film, he provided character designs and early animation tests for the villain Ursula.

In 1988, Who Framed Roger Rabbit had become a critical and commercial success, which revived a new interest in theatrical cartoon shorts. To produce further Roger Rabbit media, Disney opened the Walt Disney Feature Animation Florida in Orlando, located within the Disney-MGM Studios theme park. He then became a director for Tummy Trouble (1989) accompanied with Honey, I Shrunk the Kids (1989). He directed the next cartoon short Roller Coaster Rabbit (1990), which was attached with Dick Tracy (1990). In the meantime, Minkoff was approached to direct Beauty and the Beast (1991), but he demanded creative control over the project which then-studio chairman Jeffrey Katzenberg was unwilling to give. He also directed a Mickey Mouse short, which was shown at the Disney-MGM Studios, titled Mickey's Audition (1992).

Eager to direct a live-action film, Minkoff was handed the script for a feature-length Roger Rabbit sequel, and was hired to develop the project. However, after a year in development, the project was cancelled. On April 1, 1992, he became the co-director for The Lion King (1994) alongside Roger Allers. On the film, the directorial process began with several sequences divided between Allers and Minkoff. Each director brought their own vision to the sequences, but there was a constant exchange of viewpoints to better ensure a stylistic uniformity. In a 2011 interview, Minkoff stated he had directed the "Circle of Life" sequence while Allers directed the "I Just Can't Wait to Be King" sequence.

In January 1995, it was reported he was to direct an untitled "fantasy feature" film that was meant to be his first live-action project. The project went unproduced, in which Minkoff explained: "I had told Jeffrey [Katzenberg] before he left Disney that I wanted to do a live-action picture, and he was trying to get me to commit to doing an animated picture before that ...We were in the middle of figuring out what was the right step to take when he resigned [in 1994]." Not long after, he worked briefly with Robert Zemeckis on a film project with Universal Pictures and a version of Mr. Popper's Penguins with producers Craig Zadan and Neil Meron. In 1997, Minkoff re-teamed with them on a film adaptation of Into the Woods for Columbia Pictures. When development had stalled, Minkoff learned from the studio's production head about Stuart Little, and after subsequently reading M. Night Shyamalan's script, he agreed to direct.

In 1998, Sony Pictures had announced Minkoff was directing Stuart Little (1999). Principal photography had spanned 12 weeks before wrapping in mid-November 1998. Released in December 1999, Stuart Little was a commercial success, grossing $300 million worldwide. In November 2000, Minkoff, along with his producing partner Jason Clark, had signed a three-year first-look deal at Columbia Pictures, in which he also agreed to direct the sequel, Stuart Little 2 (2002).
Soon after, Minkoff was attached to direct a live-action Jetsons film and a remake of The Sorcerer's Apprentice, which both went unproduced. In 2002, Minkoff was hired to direct The Haunted Mansion (2003) starring Eddie Murphy. The film reunited him with producer Don Hahn, who had both worked on The Lion King (1994).

Sometime in the 2000s, Minkoff founded his own production company, Sprocketdyne Entertainment. In June 2003, it was reported that Minkoff's Sprocketdyne 
Entertainment was developing a live-action/CGI feature film titled Mr. Peabody & Sherman (based on Mister Peabody from the animated series The Adventures of Rocky and Bullwinkle and Friends) with Sony Pictures. At one point, he took the project to Walden Media, but the studio was occupied with The Chronicles of Narnia film series. Minkoff then toyed with self-financing the film himself, before bringing the film to DreamWorks Animation in 2005. In 2011, DreamWorks Animation announced it was producing the project as a computer-animated film, which reunited Minkoff with Jeffrey Katzenberg. Mr. Peabody & Sherman was finally released in March 2014.

In 2010, Minkoff had been attached to direct the fantasy action adventure Chinese Odyssey. Minkoff served as a director on the 2018 animated Netflix original animated series of the late Anna Dewdney picture book franchise Llama Llama, overseeing all aspects of production. In November 2015, Minkoff and his producing partner Pietro Ventani had signed a two-picture deal with Le Vision Pictures to co-develop and produce a CGI-animated adaptation of Wolf Totem based on the Jiang Rong novel and a live-action comedy titled Silkworms. 

In 2010, Minkoff was pitched the idea for Blazing Samurai by writer Ed Stone, who had initially envisioned an all-human cast. However, Minkoff suggested an all-animal cast, and in 2014, he was attached as a producer. After years in development, Minkoff took the director's chair after Chris Bailey had stepped down. The film was re-titled Paws of Fury: The Legend of Hank, and released in theaters on July 15, 2022.

Personal life
Minkoff met his wife Crystal Kung Minkoff, a cast member on The Real Housewives of Beverly Hills, at a party in his office in 2003, and they attended the Finding Nemo premiere as their first date. Minkoff proposed to her on Valentine's Day 2006, and they married on September 29, 2007. They have a son named Max and a daughter named Zoe.

Kung claims to be a 76th-generation descendant of Confucius. Her brother is Jeffrey Kung, a singer and radio VJ in China.

He participates as a member of the jury for the NYICFF, a local New York City film festival dedicated to screening films for children between the ages of 3 and 18.

Filmography

Short films

Feature films

Animator

Other roles

Television

References

External links

 
 
 
 
 

1962 births
20th-century American Jews
21st-century American Jews
Animators from California
American animated film directors
American animated film producers
American film producers
American male screenwriters
Animation screenwriters
American storyboard artists
California Institute of the Arts alumni
DreamWorks Animation people
Living people
Palo Alto High School alumni
Film directors from California
Film producers from California
People from Palo Alto, California
Screenwriters from California
Walt Disney Animation Studios people